Carrie Akre (born September 24, 1966) is an American singer best known for her work with Seattle underground bands Hammerbox and Goodness.

Since Goodness disbanded in 1998, she has contributed vocals to the project band The Rockfords (which included Pearl Jam's Mike McCready on guitar) and released three solo albums. She releases albums on her own label, My Way Records.

Solo discography

References 

1966 births
Living people
20th-century American singers
20th-century American women singers
21st-century American women singers
21st-century American singers